Neha Bamb is a former Indian actress worked in mainly Hindi TV Serials. She is known for playing the role of Mahi in Maayka, Kaisa Ye Pyar Hai as Kripa.

Filmography

Films

Television

References

External links
 

Living people
1975 births
Indian television actresses
Actresses in Telugu cinema
21st-century Indian actresses
Indian film actresses
Actresses from Mumbai
Actresses in Hindi television